Mohamed Salah is an Egyptian former footballer and the head coach of Saudi Arabian club Al-Shoulla.

Managerial career

Al-Shoulla
Salah was appointed manager of the Saudi club Al-Shoulla in June 2011. He made a big impact after winning the Saudi First Division with Al-Shoulla in the 2011–12 season. He then lead Al-Shoulla to 3 wins and 4 losses in the 2012–13 Saudi Premier League season.
He then went to Egypt and had an agreement with Almokaweleen.

On 21 February 2023, Salah returned to manage Al-Shoulla 11 years after his first stint at the club.

Honours

Player

Zamalek
2 Egyptian League
3 Egyptian Cup
2 African Champions League

Personal
Best Right Defender in African Cup of Nations 1980

Manager

Maaden
reached first division

Al-Shoulla
Saudi First Division (1): 2011–12

Nogoom El Mostakbal
Egyptian Second Division: 2017–18

Managerial statistics

References

External links
Goal.com Profile

Living people
Egyptian footballers
Association football forwards
Zamalek SC players
Egyptian Premier League players
Egypt international footballers
1980 African Cup of Nations players
Egyptian football managers
Al-Shoulla FC managers
Zamalek SC managers
Al-Wehda Club (Mecca) managers
Egyptian Premier League managers
Saudi First Division League managers
Egyptian expatriate football managers
Egyptian expatriate sportspeople in Saudi Arabia
Expatriate football managers in Saudi Arabia
1956 births